The Espenberg River is a  river in Alaska's North Slope flowing northeast into the Chukei Seas.

Its name is derived from the nearby point of sand, Cape Espenberg.

See also
List of Alaska rivers

References

Rivers of Northwest Arctic Borough, Alaska
Rivers of the Seward Peninsula
Drainage basins of the Chukchi Sea
Rivers of Alaska